Seán Ó Coistealbha (1930–2006) was an Irish poet and dramatist.

Ó Coistealbha was born in Inverin, Connemara, where he was more commonly known as Johnny Chóil Mhaidhc. He played the lead role in An Dochtúir Bréige and went on to win a gold medal for acting with Taidhbhearc na Gaillimhe. Fascinated by the theatre, he took to writing comic drama. Most of his plays, in which he usually played the leading character, are based on folk themes and stock situations.

Select bibliography
 An Tincéara Buí, 1962
 Pionta Amháin Uisce, 1978
 Buille Faoi Thuairim Gabha, 1987

References

Irish male poets
Irish male dramatists and playwrights
Irish-language poets
Irish translators
People from County Galway
1930 births
2006 deaths
20th-century Irish poets
20th-century Irish dramatists and playwrights
20th-century Irish male writers
20th-century Irish translators